The 9th National Assembly of Laos was elected by a popular vote on 21 February 2021 to replace the 8th National Assembly. It convened its 1st Ordinary Session on 22 March 2021.

Meetings

Officers

Presidency

Secretariat

Women Caucus

Members

References

Citations

Bibliography
Books:

9th National Assembly of Laos
2021 establishments in Laos